Platypediini is a tribe of cicadas in the family Cicadidae. There are at least 2 genera and 20 described species in Platypediini, found in the Nearctic.

Genera
These two genera belong to the tribe Platypediini:
 Neoplatypedia Davis, 1920
 Platypedia Uhler, 1888

References

Further reading

External links

 

 
Tibicininae
Hemiptera tribes